David Zacharia Kafulila (born 15 February 1982) is a Tanzanian Civil Servant and politician. 

He was a Regional Commissioner for Simiyu Region after serving as Regional Administrative Secretary for Songwe Region from 2018 to 2020. He was the NCCR–Mageuzi, and shifted to ruling party Chama cha Mapinduzi since 2017. He has been a politician and Member of Parliament for Kigoma South  constituency since 2010 to 2015. He's the first Member of Parliament to get a whistle-blower award he received such prize in the year 2015 after exposing and champion the Tegeta Escrow scandal which cost the nation loss of about $200 million USD.

References

1982 births
Living people
Tanzanian civil servants
NCCR–Mageuzi MPs
Tanzanian MPs 2010–2015
Shinyanga Secondary School alumni
University of Dar es Salaam alumni